The 1888 North-West Territories general election elected members of the 2nd Legislative Council of the North-West Territories. The 2nd Legislative Council of the North-West Territories replaced the 1st Council of the North-West Territories. The 2nd Legislative Council of the North-West Territories was replaced by the 1st North-West Assembly in 1891 when the quota of elected members was reached. (A different 2nd Council of the Northwest Territories (1905-1951) was created in 1905, when the NWT lost most of its population, to differentiate the new one from the two legislative councils of the NWT that had existed 1876 to 1891.)

The 1888 election was the first general election in the history of the North-West Territories, Canada. Elections were held in various districts between 20 June and 30 June 1888. Although considered a general election, the writs were issued to return on various days. (1891 North-West Territories general election would be the first election where all the seats came empty on the same day.)

Prior to 1888, the elected members of the 1st Council of the North-West Territories were elected in by-elections to supplement members appointed by the Government of Canada. In order to have an elected member, a constituency needed to be set up in an area  in size that had 1,000 residents.  This created a patchwork of represented and unrepresented areas across the sprawling and sparsely-settled territory.

Twenty-one members were elected in this election. 

Robert Brett, the member for Red Deer, was appointed government leader by Lieutenant Governor Joseph Royal. His official title was Chairman of the Lt. Governor's Advisory Council.

Three judges were appointed to the legislative assembly to provide legal advice, but they were not able to vote. They represented the territory at large.

Voters in this election cast their votes by telling the returning officer who they wanted to vote for. This system lasted until 1894 when a secret ballot was first used in a by-election in the Whitewood district.

Election results
Voter turnout cannot be established as no voters lists were in use. Candidates were all elected on  non-partisan basis. Decisions in the Council were decided by majority vote.

Three members were elected by acclamation. One was re-elected; two were newly-elected.

Calgary and Edmonton elected two members through Plurality block voting.

Election summary

Legal Advisors

Three Members were appointed by Lieutenant Governor Joseph Royal after the election. The purpose was to bring experience in procedure, protocol and amending and introducing legislation. The Legal Advisors held seats at large, were allowed to participate in debates (but not vote) and were paid a salary of $250.00.

The three members of the assembly who were appointed, already served as members of the Assembly previously. There were no Legal Advisors reappointed after dissolution of the 1st North-West Legislative Assembly in 1891.

Members of the Legislative Assembly elected

For complete electoral history, see individual districts

Medicine Hat
In the Medicine Hat electoral district, candidate William Finlay had withdrawn before election day. The returning officer declared Thomas Tweed elected by acclamation. Finlay lost his nomination deposit of $200.00

References

Notelist

Further reading

External links
Personnel of the Northwest Territories Assembly 1888–1905
History of Northwest Territories Assembly 1876–1905

Elections in the Northwest Territories
1888 elections in Canada
1888 in the Northwest Territories
June 1888 events